The High Sheriff of Galway Town was the Sovereign's judicial representative in the county of the Town of Galway. Initially an office for lifetime, assigned by the Sovereign, the High Sheriff became annually appointed from the Provisions of Oxford in 1258. Besides his judicial importance, he had ceremonial and administrative functions and executed High Court Writs.

History
The first (High) Shrievalties were established before the Norman Conquest in 1066 and date back to Saxon times. In 1908, an Order in Council made the Lord-Lieutenant the Sovereign's prime representative in a county and reduced the High Sheriff's precedence. Despite however that the office retained his responsibilities for the preservation of law and order in a county.

The first High Sheriff of the town was appointed in 1841 and the last one in 1899.

Victoria, 1841–1899

1841: Martin Morris
1843: Nicholas Lynch
1845: Patrick Marcus Lynch
1848: T A. Joyce of Rahasau, Loughrea.
1849: Michael Morris
1850: Thomas Moore Persse
1851: Mark Anthony Lynch
1856: Ambrose Rush
1857: Peter Sarsfield Comyn
1858: John Wilson Lynch of Duras and Renmore.
1860: George Morris
1862: Henry Hodgsen
1867: Pierce John Joyce
1868: Henry Sadleir Persse
1868: Francis Comyn of Woodstock
1870: Marcus Lynch, JP of Barna House.
1872: Sir Valentine Blake, 14th Bt.
1874: Charles French Blake-Forster
1878: Francis O'Donnellan Blake-Forster
1881: Rickard Blake.
1882: Robert William Waithman.
1884: Thomas G.P. Halett.
1885: Walter Martin Blake.
1886: Llewellyn Blake.
1887: Arthur Henry Courtenay.
1888: William Henry Persse.
1890: De Burgh Fitzpatrick Persse.
1892: Robert French Blake.
1893: John Joseph Chevers.
1898: Sir William Henry Mahon, 5th Baronet of Castlebar, Ahascragh.
1899: Thomas William Moffett.

References

 
Galway Town
Politics of Galway (city)